Zaķumuiža is a village in Ropaži Municipality in the Vidzeme region of Latvia. Zaķumuiža had 900 residents as of 2006.

Towns and villages in Latvia
Ropaži Municipality
Kreis Riga
Vidzeme